Asiya bint Muzahim was, according to the Qur'an and Islamic tradition, the wife of the Pharaoh of the Exodus and adoptive mother of Moses, identified as Bithiah in the Jewish tradition. She is revered by Muslims as one of the four greatest women of all time, and according to a prophetic narration in Sahih al-Bukhari, the second ever.

She is believed to have secretly accepted monotheism after witnessing the miracle of Moses. The tradition holds that Asiya worshipped God in secret and prayed in disguise fearing her husband. She adopted Moses and convinced her husband not to kill him. She died while being tortured by her husband, who had discovered her monotheism and retaliated to her rebellion against his tyranny.

Narrative
Asiya's marriage to the Pharaoh was arranged. Unlike her husband, she was humble and accepted the faith that Moses and Aaron were preaching. Although she had exceeding wealth, she was not arrogant like the Pharaoh. She realized that faith was far more important and was thus exalted by God amongst the women of her generation.

Asiya and her maids found a crate floating in the Nile river. Asiya ordered that the crate be drawn ashore. The maids thought there was a treasure inside, but instead found a baby boy, Moses. Asiya instantly felt motherly love towards him. She told the Pharaoh about the baby. The incident has been described in the Quran.

Asiya offered Moses's biological mother to live in their household as his wet nurse and paid her for her services, unaware of their relationship.

When she witnessed the death of a believing woman under her husband's torture, Asiya declared her faith before the Pharaoh. He tried to turn her away from the faith, but Asiya refused to reject the God and the teaching of Moses. On Pharaoh's orders, she was tortured to death.

Veneration
Asiya is one of the four most respected women of all time, and is highly honored by Muslims. It is said that Asiya was a sincere believer and that she fully submitted herself to Allah, despite being the wife of Pharaoh. According to Hadith, she will be among the first women to enter Paradise because she accepted Moses's monotheism over Pharaoh's beliefs. The Qur'an mentions Asiya as an example to all Muslims: Her supplication is mentioned in the Quran.

Abu Musa Ashaari narrated that once the Islamic prophet, Muhammad stated:

See also 
 Bithiah
 Iset-nofret, one of the prominent Great Royal Wives of Pharaoh Ramesses the Great
 Fatimah az-Zahra
 Khadijah bint Khuwaylid
 Maryam bint Imran
 Pharaoh's daughter (Exodus)

References

People of the Quran
Moses
Muslim female saints
Hebrew Bible people in Islam
Great Royal Wives
Pharaoh's daughter (Exodus)
Executed ancient Egyptian people
People executed by ancient Egypt
Executed royalty
Unnamed people of the Bible